Serge Gaisser (born 5 January 1958) is a French former footballer who played as a midfielder and is best known for his years with FC Basel and FC Mulhouse.

Career 
Born in Muespach, Gaisser grew up in Saint-Louis, Haut-Rhin and started his football by the localclub Saint-Louis Neuweg. However, he started his professional football career by Racing Besançon in the 1977–78 French Division 2. But because he only played in six games during the entire season as the team finished in second position in the league, Gaisser returned somewhat disillusioned to Saint-Louis.

A year later Gaisser signed for FC Basel at the begin of the 1979–80 Nationalliga A season. He played 23 games during that season, scoring 3 goals, and thus helped Basel win the championship title. In the 1981 Coppa delle Alpi final against Sochaux, which ended 2–2 and Basel won in the penalty shootout, Gaisser scored one goal and successfully converted his penalty.  In the 1979 Uhrencup final (4-1 win against Grenchen) Gaisser also scored a goal. He stayed in Basel for four seasons.

Gaisser transferred to Mulhouse before the start of the 1983–84 French Division 2 season. He played three seasons for Mulhouse before he transferred to Concordia Basel to end his football career.

Private life
Later, Serge Gaisser acted as trainer for the youth teams by local clubs Sierentz, Muespach and Blotzheim. Gaisser is currently working in accounting, finance and controlling in the construction and transport department Basel-Stadt.

Honours
 Swiss League: 1979–80
 Uhrencup: 1979, 1980
 Coppa delle Alpi: 1981

Sources and references
 Cup of the Alps 1981 at RSSSF

External links 
 
 Winners, goals und results from 1962-2010 of the Uhrencup

FC Basel players
FC Concordia Basel players
French footballers
Association football fullbacks
1958 births
Living people